Theobald (c. 854-895), count of Arles, was a Frank from the Bosonid-family. 

He was a son of Hucbert. 

He and his wife Bertha had two sons, Hugh of Italy and Boso of Tuscany. 

Bosonids
Nobility of the Carolingian Empire
Counts of Arles
850s births
895 deaths
Year of birth uncertain